Pierre Michael (11 April 1932, Charleroi, Belgium-4 June 2001, Paris, France) was a French actor.

Filmography

1932 births
2001 deaths
Actors from Charleroi
French male film actors
French male television actors
French male stage actors